Inferno is a 2001 28-minute-long sci-fi film directed by Paul Kousoulides, featuring UK cult actress/presenter Emily Booth.

Plot
Set inside a "Quake" like video game, one of the game's cannon-fodder grunts falls for the Lara Croft-inspired heroine and, in a constantly looping game level, tries time and again to catch her attention before she can "chain gun" him.

Cast
Sanjeev Bhaskar: "Jaz"
Nitin Ganatra: "Naz"
Emily Booth: "Laura"
Alan Talbot: "Mr. Bonecrusher"

Prizes
Commissioned by the UK's Channel 4, Inferno won the Silver Hugo Award at the 2002 Chicago International Film Festival, Best Short Film at the 2002 London Sci-Fi Film Festival. It was also nominated for a BAFTA for Best Short Film in 2002.

External links
 

2001 short films
British short films
Films about video games
Films about firefighting
2001 films
2001 science fiction films
2000s English-language films